The 2008 Asia-Pacific Rally Championship season (APRC) was an international rally championship organized by the FIA. The champion was Australian driver Cody Crocker. In winning the 2008 Malaysian Rally, Crocker successfully defended his title from the previous two years, to equal the record of three APRC titles set by Possum Bourne, Kenneth Eriksson and Karamjit Singh.

Calendar
The 2008 APRC was as follows:

Points
The 2008 APRC for Drivers points was as follows:

References

External links
Official website
APRC Live Podcast
APRC News and Video
FIA Asia-Pacific Rally Championship

Asia-Pacific Rally Championship seasons
Asia-Pacific Rally
Rally
Rally